The Wassily Chair, also known as the Model B3 chair, was designed by Marcel Breuer in 1925–1926 while he was the head of the cabinet-making workshop at the Bauhaus, in Dessau, Germany. 

Despite popular belief, the chair was not designed specifically for the non-objective painter Wassily Kandinsky, who was on the Bauhaus faculty at the same time. Kandinsky had admired the completed design, and Breuer fabricated a duplicate for Kandinsky's personal quarters. The chair became known as "Wassily" decades later when it was re-released by Italian manufacturer Gavina which had learned of the anecdotal Kandinsky connection in the course of its research on the chair's origins.

History
A champion of the modern movement and protégé of Bauhaus founder Walter Gropius, Marcel Breuer is equally celebrated for his achievements in architecture and furniture. Breuer was an outstanding student and subsequently a master carpenter at the Bauhaus in the early 1920s. His entire body of work, both architecture and furniture, embodies the driving Bauhaus objective to reconcile art and industry. While at the Bauhaus, Breuer revolutionized the modern interior with his tubular-steel furniture collection – inspired by bicycle construction and fabricated using the techniques of local plumbers. His first designs, including the Wassily, remain among the most identifiable icons of the modern furniture movement.

The chair later known as the "Wassily" was first manufactured in the late 1920s by Thonet, the German-Austrian furniture manufacturer most known for its bent-wood chair designs, under the name Model B3. It was first available in both a folding and a non-folding version. In this early iteration, the straps were made of fabric, pulled taut on the reverse side with the use of springs.

The fabric used was made from Eisengarn ('iron yarn'), a strong, shiny, waxed-cotton thread. It had been invented in the 19th century, but Margaretha Reichardt (1907–1984), a student at the Bauhaus weaving workshop, experimented and improved the quality of the thread and developed cloth and strapping material for use on Breuer's tubular-steel chairs. 

The Thonet produced version of the chair is most rare, and went out of production during World War II.

Most of Breuer's early designs were produced under license by the Berlin-based manufacturer, Standard-Möbel, Lengyel & Company. The Wassily chair was the only significant early Breuer design not offered by Standard-Möbel, Lengyel & Co.

After the War years, Gavina picked up the license for the Wassily, along with the Breuer designs previously sold by Standard-Möbel, Lengyel & Co., and introduced the more recognized Wassily version that replaced the fabric with black leather straps, though the fabric version was still made available. In 1968 Knoll bought the Gavina Group of Bologna. This brought all of Breuer's design into the Knoll catalog.

This chair was revolutionary in the use of the materials (bent tubular steel and Eisengarn) and methods of manufacturing. In 1925 Breuer purchased his first bicycle and he was impressed with the lightness of its tubular steel frame. This inspired him to experiment with using the material in furniture design. The design (and all subsequent steel tubing furniture) was technologically feasible only because the German steel manufacturer Mannesmann had recently perfected a process for making seamless steel tubing. . Previously, steel tubing had a welded seam, which would collapse when the tubing was bent.

The Wassily chair, like many other designs of the modernist movement, has been mass-produced since the late 1920s, and continuously in production since the 1950s. A design classic is still available today. Though patent designs are expired, the trademark name rights to the design are owned by Knoll of New York City. Reproductions are produced around the world by other manufacturers, who market the product under many names.

See also 

 Adirondack chair
 Aeron chair
 Barcelona chair
 Cantilever chair
 Curule chair
 Faldstool
 Glastonbury chair
 Grand Confort
 List of chairs
 Turned chair
 Watchman's chair
 X-chair

References

1925 in art
1926 in art
Chairs
Bauhaus
Modernism
German design
Marcel Breuer furniture
Wassily Kandinsky
Individual models of furniture